John Paul Filo (born August 21, 1948) is an American photographer whose picture of 14-year-old runaway Mary Ann Vecchio screaming while kneeling over the dead body of 20-year-old Jeffrey Miller, one of the victims of the Kent State shootings, won him the Pulitzer Prize in 1971.  At the time, Filo was both a photojournalism student at Kent State University, and staffer of the Valley Daily News, which became the Valley News Dispatch - now a satellite paper for the Greensburg Tribune-Review.

Biography
After winning the Pulitzer Prize while working for the Valley Daily News (a Gannett paper) of the Pittsburgh suburb of Tarentum, Pennsylvania, he continued his career in photojournalism, rapidly finding work at the Associated Press, the Philadelphia Inquirer, and as a picture editor at the Baltimore Evening Sun. He eventually rose to a picture editing job at the weekly news magazine Newsweek. He is now head of photography for CBS.

Taking the picture

The Kent State shooting by members of the Ohio National Guard occurred at Kent State University in the city of Kent, Ohio on May 4, 1970, and resulted in the deaths of four students. At the time John Filo was in the university student photography lab when the shots rang out.  He quickly ran outside and below recalls what happened:

To take the picture John used a Nikkormat camera with Tri-X film and most of the exposures were 1/500 between 5.6 and f 8 depending on whether the sun was behind a cloud or not.

Altered photo
In the early 1970s, an anonymous editor airbrushed the fence post above Mary Ann Vecchio's head out of Filo's Pulitzer Prize Winner photograph. Since then, the altered photo has circulated and has been reprinted in many magazines.  Numerous publications, including Time (Nov. 6, 1972, p. 23; Jan. 7, 1980, p. 45) and People (May 2, 1977, p. 37; April 30, 1990, p. 117), have used the altered image without knowing it.

Meeting with Mary Ann Vecchio
In 1995, Filo met Mary Ann Vecchio for the first time, when both were scheduled to appear at an Emerson College conference commemorating the 25th anniversary of the shootings. The two met again on the Kent State University campus, at the 39th commemoration in May 2009, where they both spoke.

References

External links
 with John Filo by Stephen McKiernan, Binghamton University Libraries Center for the Study of the 1960s

1948 births
Living people
People from Harrison Township, Allegheny County, Pennsylvania
American photojournalists
Journalists from Pennsylvania
Kent State shootings
Kent State University alumni
Pulitzer Prize for Photography winners
20th-century American journalists
American male journalists